A bloc party (German: Blockpartei) in politics may refer to a political party that is a constituent member of an electoral bloc. However, this term also has a more specific meaning, referring to non-ruling but legal political parties in a one-party state (most notably communist regimes) as auxiliary parties and members of a ruling coalition, differing such governments from pure one-party states such as Nazi Germany and the Soviet Union, although such minor parties rarely if ever constitute opposition parties or alternative sources of power. Other authoritarian regimes may also have multiple political parties which are nominally independent in order to give the appearance of political pluralism, but support or act in de facto cooperation with the government or ruling party.

Sometimes, a bloc party is called a satellite party.

Background
The concept has its roots in the Popular front idea where Marxist and non-Marxist political parties and other organisations would belong in an umbrella organisation. Following the end of World War II, elections were held in areas already under Soviet influence who would become members of the Eastern Bloc, that while giving voters a choice would be seen as a step towards a totalitarian, Communist-led regime. Bloc parties were able to retain their non-Marxist orientation, but in practice were always subordinate to the ruling Communist party, and all legal parties and civic organisations were required to be members of the official coalition. Elections were not competitive as the composition of legislatures was generally pre-determined. Parties only occasionally dissented from the line of the ruling party. Some parties were pre-existing, others had been newly formed, to appeal to specific sectors of society. However, during the fall of Communism, many hitherto subordinate bloc parties would begin to assert their independence and play a role in the democratisation process, while others would be unable to continue functioning either due to a loss of guaranteed yet artificial representation (granted to them by the ruling Communist Party), or due to the stigma of being associated with subservience to the Communists, and would either dissolve or fade into obscurity.

Bloc parties under Communist regimes
East Germany, Czechoslovakia, Poland and Bulgaria operated bloc party systems where non-communist parties were constituent members of an official coalition. A similar system operates in China today.

East Germany
In the German Democratic Republic, the National Front was the umbrella organisation which included the ruling Socialist Unity Party of Germany, other political parties and various non-party organisations. Along similar lines to the formation of parties in West Germany, new parties in the Soviet zone (that would become the German Democratic Republic) were formed to replace the parties of the pre-Nazi period, whereas the Social Democratic Party of Germany and Communist Party of Germany merged to form the Socialist Unity Party of Germany. These parties were the Christian Democratic Union (CDU), Liberal Democratic Party of Germany (LDPD), and later the National Democratic Party of Germany (NDPD) and Democratic Farmers' Party of Germany (DBD).

As the Communists consolidated their power, the bloc parties all jettisoned their original programs. All of them nominally embraced "socialism", becoming loyal partners of the SED. With few exceptions, they voted unanimously for all government proposals. One of the few notable dissensions of a bloc party occurred in 1972 when members of the CDU in the Volkskammer took a stand against the legalisation of abortion, with the party's deputies either voting against the law or abstaining.

During Die Wende, the bloc parties began to assert themselves and emerge as independent parties, leading to the first and only free election to the Volkskammer in 1990. During the process of German reunification, the bloc parties merged with their western counterparts. Non-party organisations such as the Free German Youth, Kulturbund and the Democratic Women's League of Germany broke their formal affiliation with the former ruling party, but only the Free German Youth still operates today.

China

In China, under the premise of United Front, 8  have been recognized by the government. All the eight parties established in China before the creation of People's Republic of China, and are willing to collaborate with the Chinese Communist Party administration, have been recognized as "parties that can help joint administration of the country under Chinese Communist Party's lead". These parties are tasked to accept Chinese Communist Parties' leadership as well as political principle and direction.

Czechoslovakia
The 1946 elections saw only parties of the National Front, dominated by the Communist Party of Czechoslovakia, take part. However, elections were competitive, with the Communists and Social Democrats prevailing in the Czech lands, and the anti-Communist Democratic Party winning a comfortable majority in Slovakia. In 1948, however, the Communists seized power and non-Marxist parties were made subordinate to the Communists. During the Velvet Revolution, the parties became more assertive in pressuring for change, and transformed themselves for democratic politics. The Christian democratic Czechoslovak People's Party remains a player in Czech parliamentary politics.

Poland
The 1947 elections were blatantly rigged in favour of the Democratic Bloc, with Communist and Socialist parties being merged to form the Polish United Workers' Party (PZPR). In 1952 the Front of National Unity was formed, including the PZPR, the agrarian United People's Party (ZSL) and the centrist Democratic Party (SD), while up to three Catholic associations also had representation in the Sejm. Occasionally, deputies from these groups (most notably the Catholic Znak) offered limited criticism of government policies. A number of deputies from bloc parties also voted against the imposition of Martial Law in Poland, after which the Front of National Unity was replaced by the Patriotic Movement for National Rebirth which included the same as well as additional member organisations.

In 1989, partly free elections were held in which Solidarity won an overwhelming majority of freely contestable seats- only 35% of the Sejm- while the PZPR and bloc parties were reserved 65% of the seats. The ZSL and SD formed a coalition government with Solidarity, thus forming Poland's first non-Communist government since World War II. The SD continues today, whereas the ZSL eventually evolved into today's Polish People's Party. Two of the Catholic associations with Sejm representation continue today as lay Catholic organisations.

Bulgaria
During Communist rule in Bulgaria, the Bulgarian Agrarian People's Union was the only other legal party than the Bulgarian Communist Party as a member of the Fatherland Front. A number of successor parties exist in post-Communist Bulgaria.

Other examples
In countries like North Korea or Vietnam (until 1988), bloc parties also exist, playing a subordinate role to ruling Communist parties as constituent members of official coalitions.

In non-communist regimes
A few examples of a bloc party system also exist in non-Communist regimes. In these cases, it is possible to have a bloc party simply be a smaller party in a coalition, often long-lasting, with a larger or more dominant party with no direct connection between the two.

Australia
Since the 1920s, the main centre-right force in Australian politics at the federal level has been an alliance of parties known as the Coalition: originally consisting of the Nationalist Party and the Australian Country Party, it currently includes those parties' successors, the Liberal Party of Australia and the National Party of Australia. The Coalition's formation was prompted by the rise of the centre-left Australian Labor Party, which remains the Coalition's main political opponent. The two parties of the Coalition draw support from different bases, with the Liberals gaining their votes in urban areas and the Nationals winning theirs in rural areas. Arrangements at state and territorial level vary, from the merger of state Liberal and National parties through to electoral alliances on the federal model and, in the case of Western Australia, a looser relationship.

Bulgaria
The Bulgarian Socialist Party (BSP) and other leftist parties in Bulgaria have been members of the leftist electoral alliance Coalition for Bulgaria since 1991.

Germany
The Christian Democratic Union of Germany does not contest elections in Bavaria, where its place is taken by the somewhat more conservative and Catholic-influenced Christian Social Union. They form a common CDU/CSU bloc in the Bundestag.

Hong Kong

The Hong Kong pro-democracy camp has been establishing an electoral coalition in local level elections. Unless there is a coordination failure, the parties within the camp will not contest against each other in local level elections. In the coming General Election, they also launch primaries to ensure the greatest coordination and thus greatest possible number of seats, at best simple majority (35+) can be achieved.

Hungary
The Christian Democratic People's Party is the coalition partner of the ruling party Fidesz, and has run with Fidesz on a joint electoral list in elections since 2006. However, over time the party has lost popular support to the point it can no longer be measured in opinion polls, and today effectively operates as a satellite party of Fidesz, with the last time it got into parliament on its own being in 1994.

Mexico 
In Mexico during the rule of the Institutional Revolutionary Party (PRI, 1929–2000), partidos paleros (satellite parties) included the Authentic Party of the Mexican Revolution and the Socialist Popular Party. These helped the PRI government give the superficial appearance of a competitive democratic system. In fact, both satellite parties fully supported the government and co-nominated the PRI candidates for the Presidency of Mexico until 1988.

New Zealand
ACT New Zealand, a right-wing libertarian party, runs its leader as a candidate in the Epsom electorate. In Epsom, the ACT leader is typically endorsed by the National Party and its leader. After the election, the ACT leader can then be offered a cabinet position, and the party can serve as a coalition partner in a National government.

Russia
The All-Russia People's Front includes the ruling United Russia, A Just Russia — For Truth, Rodina, New People, the Progressive Socialist Party of Ukraine, the Russian Union of Afghanistan Veterans, the Russian Union of Industrialists and Entrepreneurs, the Young Guard of United Russia, the Federation of Independent Trade Unions of Russia, and others.

Scandinavian countries 
In multiple countries in Scandinavia, parties generally run in elections separately but cooperate with other parties of similar ideology and outlook, and are grouped together by media, commentators, and party members for the purposes of the formation of a coalition government: a "red" bloc of centre-left and left-wing parties, and a "blue" bloc of centre-right and right-wing parties. Parties almost always form coalition governments consisting of their particular bloc if they have a majority, with the largest party nominating the position of Prime Minister.

South Korea
The Future Korea Party was a bloc party of the United Future Party (UFP), at the time the country's main opposition party. All parties excluding the UFP accepted a new election law starting in 2020 which led to the adoption of a more proportional election system. Thirty seats now used the additional member system, which allocates on a compensatory manner to make seats more closely match the popular vote if a party won a lower percentage of seats via single-member constituencies than their popular vote percentage. The AMS is more disadvantageous for larger parties like the UFP and Democratic Party (DP) than the prior system, which did not compensate parties for differences between their popular vote percentage and seat percentage, as the two major parties have generally won a larger percentage of seats than their popular vote percentage. As a result, the UFP sought to exploit the new system by making a bloc party for the 2020 South Korean legislative election in order to get more electoral seats that are under their control, as they would otherwise be allocated little or no extra compensatory seats. The DP did the same with the Platform Party. Both bloc parties were dissolved following the election.

Syria
The National Progressive Front is an umbrella organisation comprising the Ba'ath Party and several other pro-government parties, who in practice play a subordinate role to the Ba'ath Party. Traditionally, legal political parties were required to follow the socialist and Arab nationalist or pan-Arabist orientation of the al-Assad regime. More recently, parties have been no longer required to do so in order to receive legal recognition and one such party, the Syrian Social Nationalist Party, was both legalised and admitted to the NPF. This has given rise to suggestions other parties that are neither socialist nor Arab nationalist will gain recognition, but ethnically based (Kurdish or Assyrian) parties continue to be repressed, and Islamist parties remain illegal.

Turkmenistan 
The country operated under a one-party system under the Democratic Party of Turkmenistan (TDP) from independence until 2008. However, the country remains totalitarian with the TDP not facing any competitive challenges in elections. The two other parties in the legislature as of 2018, the Agrarian Party and Party of Industrialists and Entrepreneurs, are seen as having only been created in order to give the impression of a multi-party system.

United Kingdom

Labour Party
The Labour Party and Co-operative Party have an electoral agreement under which elections in some constituencies are contested by Co-operative Party members as joint candidates.

Northern Ireland
Two of the three largest national parties do not actively contest elections in Northern Ireland. The two Northern Irish parties that are affiliated with parties that compete in the rest of the UK are the Social Democratic and Labour Party with Labour, and the Alliance Party of Northern Ireland with the Liberal Democrats. The Conservative Party runs candidates in Northern Ireland but used to support the Ulster Unionist Party.

Uzbekistan 
The country's ruling party, the Liberal Democratic Party, has never faced true opposition since its creation, with all other parliamentary parties seen as being allied with the government, only existing to give the impression of multi-party politics.

See also
Political alliance
Electoral alliance
Decoy list
Arab satellite lists
Systemic opposition

References

Political terminology
Political science terminology
Political parties
Political party alliances
Types of political parties